Van Dam's dwarf worm lizard (Zygaspis vandami), also known commonly as the sand-dwelling dwarf worm lizard and Van Dam's round-headed worm lizard, is a species of amphisbaenian in the family Amphisbaenidae. The species is native to southern Africa. There are two recognized subspecies.

Etymology
The specific name, vandami, is in honor of South African Herpetologist Gerhardus Petrus Frederick Van Dam (died 1927).

Geographic range
Z. vandami is found in Mozambique, South Africa, and Zimbabwe.

Habitat
The preferred natural habitats of Z. vandami are sand, sandy-soils, and humus-rich soils.

Description
It is uniformly dark purplish brown dorsally, and light purple ventrally. The chin and the anal area are white.

Behavior
A burrowing species, Z. vandami is usually found under logs and stones.

Reproduction
Z. vandami is oviparous.

Subspecies
Two subspecies are recognized as being valid, including the nominotypical subspecies.
Zygaspis vandami arenicola 
Zygaspis vandami vandami 

Nota bene: A trinomial authority in parentheses indicates that the subspecies was originally described in a genus other than Zygaspis.

References

Further reading
Broadley DG, Broadley S (1997). "A revision of the African genus Zygaspis Cope (Reptilia: Amphisbaenia)". Syntarsus 4: 1–24. (Zygaspis vandami arenicola, new subspecies).
FitzSimons V (1930). "Descriptions of New South African Species of Reptilia and Batrachia, with Distribution Records of Allied Species in the Transvaal Museum Collection". Annals of the Transvaal Museum 14 (1): 20–48. (Amphisbaena vandami, new species, pp. 32–33, Figures 11–14).

Zygaspis
Reptiles of South Africa
Endemic fauna of South Africa
Taxa named by Vivian Frederick Maynard FitzSimons
Reptiles described in 1930